Leif Edward Ottesen Kennair (born 19 March 1970) is a Norwegian psychologist and Professor of Personality Psychology at the Norwegian University of Science and Technology. He is married to Tonje Westgaard Kennair, and they have three children together. He was director of the Department of Psychology from 2009 to 2013. His research interests include clinical psychology and evolutionary psychology, and he is widely known for participating in public debate, including the NRK TV series Hjernevask in 2010. He has conducted research on treatment of obsessive–compulsive disorder, anxiety and depression, and on jealousy, sexual behaviour, sexual harassment and hormonal influence on sexual behaviour.

References

Living people
1970 births
Norwegian psychologists
Academic staff of the Norwegian University of Science and Technology